Huang Chuping (born October 1962) is a Chinese politician and the current party branch secretary of Guangdong People's Congress. Previously he served as chairman of the Hubei Provincial Committee of the Chinese People's Political Consultative Conference and before that, executive vice governor of Hubei. He is a delegate to the 13th National People's Congress.

Early life and education
Huang was born in Huanggang, Hubei, in October 1962. In 1980, he was accepted to Wuhan Institute of Iron and Steel (now Wuhan University of Science and Technology), majoring in metal materials and heat treatment. After graduation, he worked at the institute.

Career in Hubei
In May 1997, he became deputy secretary of Wuhan Municipal Committee of the Communist Youth League, rising to secretary in October 1997. He served as governor of Jianghan District from August 2002 to November 2004, and party secretary, the top political position in the district, from August 2004 to December 2006. He was appointed secretary-general of CCP Wuhan Municipal Committee in December 2006 and was admitted to member of the standing committee of the CCP Wuhan Municipal Committee, the city's top authority. In March 2007, he was named acting mayor of Xianning, replacing . He was installed as mayor in August. In March 2008, he was promoted to be party secretary, concurrently serving as chairman of its People's Congress since June of that same year. In June 2012, he was promoted to member of the standing committee of the CCP Hubei Provincial Committee, the province's top authority. He was party secretary of Yichang in July 2012, and held that office until December 2016. In December 2012, he was promoted to become executive vice governor, a position he held until January 2021, when he was appointed chairman of the Hubei Provincial Committee of the Chinese People's Political Consultative Conference, the province's top political advisory body.

Career in Guangdong
In December 2021, he was assigned to south China's Guangdong province and appointed party branch secretary of Guangdong People's Congress.

References

1962 births
Living people
People from Huanggang
Wuhan University of Science and Technology alumni
University of Science and Technology Beijing alumni
Zhongnan University of Economics and Law alumni
People's Republic of China politicians from Hubei
Chinese Communist Party politicians from Hubei
Delegates to the 13th National People's Congress